B-Sides & Rarities is a 3CD compilation by Nick Cave and the Bad Seeds, released in March 2005. It features over 20 years of the band's B-sides and previously unreleased tracks. It is also the first recording to include all members of the Bad Seeds, past and present up to the time of its release: current members Mick Harvey, Blixa Bargeld, Thomas Wydler, Martyn P. Casey, Conway Savage, Jim Sclavunos, and Warren Ellis, and former members Barry Adamson, Hugo Race, Kid Congo Powers, Roland Wolf, and James Johnston. A second volume, B-Sides & Rarities Part II, was released in October 2021.

Content 
In addition to the large number of B-sides that make up the majority of the compilation, the record includes two unreleased songs, two unreleased covers, as well as live and acoustic versions of Bad Seeds tracks.

Some of the tracks were originally released as Nick Cave solo tracks, namely "Helpless", "Cassiel's Song", the Shane MacGowan collaboration "What a Wonderful World", and "A Rainy Night in Soho".

Track listing 
All songs written by Nick Cave unless otherwise stated

Disc 1
 "Deanna" (Acoustic Version) – 2:51
Acoustic version of the song from "Tender Prey" (Recorded January 8th, 1990 at Fun City Studios). Attached as a bonus 7" to initial pressings of The Good Son album, 1990
 "The Mercy Seat" (Acoustic Version) (lyrics: Cave; music: Cave, Harvey) - 3:45
Acoustic version of the song from "Tender Prey", (Recorded May 1989 at Hansa Ton Studios). Attached as a bonus 7" to initial pressings of The Good Son album, 1990
 "City of Refuge" (Acoustic Version) – 2:42
Acoustic version of the song from "Tender Prey" (Recorded January 8th, 1990 at Fun City Studios). Attached as a bonus 7" to initial pressings of The Good Son album, 1990
 "The Moon is in the Gutter" – 2:35
B-side of "In the Ghetto", 1984
 "The Six Strings that Drew Blood" – 4:47
B-side of "Tupelo", 1985
 "Rye Whiskey" (Traditional; arranged by Cave and Mick Harvey) - 3:27
Flexidisc in Reflex magazine in 1989
 "Running Scared" (Roy Orbison, Joe Melson) - 2:06
B-side of "The Singer", 1986
 "Black Betty" (Lead Belly) - 2:32
B-side of "The Singer", 1986
 "Scum" (lyrics: Cave; music: Cave, Harvey) - 2:53
Flexidisc sold at concerts, 1986
 "The Girl at the Bottom of My Glass" – 4:48
B-side of "Deanna" 12", 1988
 "The Train Song" – 3:26
B-side of 'The Ship Song', 1990
 "Cocks 'N' Asses" (lyrics: Cave; music: Cave, Victor Van Vugt) - 5:43
B-side of "The Weeping Song", 1990, retitled as "The B-Side Song" on the US single
 "Blue Bird" – 2:46
B-side of "Straight to You/Jack the Ripper", 1992
 "Helpless" (Neil Young) - 3:51
From Neil Young Tribute/Charity Album The Bridge, 1989. Also B-side of "The Weeping Song", 1990
 "God's Hotel" – 3:07
Live Radio Session for KCRW Santa Monica. Released on Rare on Air Vol. 1, Mammoth Records, 1992
 "(I'll Love You) Till the End of the World" – 3:58
From the original soundtrack Until the End of the World, 1991. Also B-side of "Loverman", 1994
 "Cassiel's Song" – 3:35
From the original soundtrack Faraway, So Close, 1993. Also B-side of "Do You Love Me?", 1994
 "Tower of Song" (Leonard Cohen) - 5:39
From Leonard Cohen tribute album I'm Your Fan, 1991
 "What Can I Give You?" – 3:40
From the French promo give-away with Henry's Dream, 1992

Disc 2
 "What a Wonderful World" (George David Weiss, George Douglas) - 3:04
From the single "What a Wonderful World", 1992
 "Rainy Night in Soho" (Shane MacGowan) - 3:58
Harvey & Bill McGee – String and woodwind arrangement
From the single "What a Wonderful World", 1992
 "Lucy" (Version #2) – 2:23
From the single "What a Wonderful World", 1992
 "Jack the Ripper" (Acoustic Version) – 4:45
B-side of the limited edition 7" "Straight to You/Jack the Ripper", 1992
 "Sail Away" – 4:13
B-side of "Do You Love Me?", 1994
 "There's No Night Out in the Jail" (John Harold Ashe) - 3:43
Recorded for a compilation of Australian country music cover versions which was never released, 1993
 "That's What Jazz Is to Me" (lyrics: Cave; music: Cave, Harvey, Savage, Wydler) - 5:05
Improvised piece. B-side of "Red Right Hand", 1994
 "The Willow Garden" (Traditional; arranged by Cave and Ellis) - 3:59
B-side of "Where the Wild Roses Grow", 1995
 "The Ballad of Robert Moore and Betty Coltrane" – 3:35
B-side of "Where the Wild Roses Grow", 1995
 "King Kong Kitchee Kitchee Ki-Mi-O" (Traditional; arranged by Cave) - 3:10
B-side of "Henry Lee", 1996
 "Knoxville Girl" (Traditional; arranged by Cave and Johnston) - 3:36
B-side of "Henry Lee", 1996
 "Where the Wild Roses Grow" – 3:47
Version with original guide vocal by Blixa Bargeld. Previously unreleased, 1995
 "O'Malley's Bar Pt. 1" – 5:16
From Mark Radcliffe Radio 1 session, 1996
 "O'Malley's Bar Pt. 2" – 6:38
From Mark Radcliffe Radio 1 session, 1996
 "O'Malley's Bar Pt. 3" – 4:57
From Mark Radcliffe Radio 1 session, 1996
 "Time Jesum Transeuntum et Non Riverentum" (lyrics: Cave; music: Cave, Ellis, Turner, White) - 6:22
Featuring The Dirty 3. Hidden track on X-Files album, 1996
 "O'Malley's Bar Reprise" – 1:03
From Mark Radcliffe Radio 1 session, 1996
 "Red Right Hand" (Scream 3 version) (lyrics: Cave; music: Cave, Harvey, Wydler) - 6:01
Recorded for the movie Scream 3. Previously unreleased, 1999

Disc 3
 "Little Empty Boat" (lyrics: Cave; music: Cave, Bargeld, Casey, Harvey) - 4:26
B-side of "Into My Arms", 1997
 "Right Now I'm a-Roaming" (lyrics: Cave; music: Cave, Casey, Harvey, Savage, Wydler) - 4:21
B-side of "Into My Arms", 1997
 "Come Into My Sleep" – 3:47
B-side of "(Are You) The One That I've Been Waiting For?", 1997
 "Black Hair" (Band Version) – 4:13
B-side of "(Are You) The One That I've Been Waiting For?", 1997
 "Babe, I Got You Bad" – 3:51
B-side of "(Are You) The One That I've Been Waiting For?", 1997
 "Sheep May Safely Graze" – 4:14
Unreleased studio outtake, 1996
 "Opium Tea" (Cave, Savage) - 3:48
Unreleased studio outtake, 1996
 "Grief Came Riding" – 5:05
From limited edition of No More Shall We Part album, 2001
 "Bless His Ever Loving Heart" – 4:02
From limited edition of No More Shall We Part album, 2001
 "Good Good Day" – 4:04
B-side of "As I Sat Sadly By Her Side", 2001
 "Little Janey's Gone" – 2:59
B-side of "As I Sat Sadly by Her Side", 2001
 "I Feel So Good" (J. B. Lenoir) - 1:44
From the film The Soul of a Man by Wim Wenders, 2003
 "Shoot Me Down" – 3:32
B-side of "Bring It On", 2003
 "Swing Low" – 5:40
B-side of "Bring It On", 2003
 "Little Ghost Song" – 3:44
B-side of "He Wants You/Babe, I'm On Fire", 2003
 "Everything Must Converge" – 3:17
B-side of "He Wants You/Babe, I'm On Fire", 2003
 "Nocturama" – 4:01
B-side of limited edition 7" "Rock of Gibraltar", 2003
 "She's Leaving You" (lyrics: Cave; music: Cave, Ellis, Casey, Sclavunos) - 4:01
B-side of "Nature Boy", 2004
 "Under This Moon" – 4:01
B-side of "Breathless/There She Goes, My Beautiful World", 2004

Musicians
 Bronwyn Adams - backing vocals, violin
 Barry Adamson - bass, timpani, orchestral arrangements
 Blixa Bargeld - guitar, backing vocals, vocals, handclaps, slide guitar, pedal steel guitar, feedback guitar, percussion
 Martyn P. Casey - bass, backing vocals, percussion
 Nick Cave - vocals, piano, Hammond organ, harmonica, backing vocals, keyboards, whistling, guitar, string synth, sound effects
 Tony Cohen - backing vocals, percussion
 Kid Congo Powers - backing vocals, handclaps, slide guitar, tremolo guitar
 Terry Edwards - brass section
 Warren Ellis - violin, mandolin, bouzouki, looped violin
 Mick Gallagher - backing vocals
 Mick Harvey - guitar, backing vocals, acoustic guitar, bass, organ, drums, string arrangements, piano, Hammond organ, marimba, keyboards, sound effects, cymbals, vibes, xylophone, woodwind arrangement
 Chas Jankel - backing vocals
 James Johnston - organ, guitar
 Shane MacGowan - vocals
 Anna McGarrigle - backing vocals
 Kate McGarrigle - backing vocals
 Bill McGee - string arrangement, woodwind arrangement
 Astrid Munday - percussion
 Tracy Pew - bass
 Hugo Race - guitar
 Conway Savage - piano, organ, backing vocals, vocals, electric piano, Hammond organ, percussion
 Jim Sclavunos - drums, brushed snare, tambourine, percussion, tubular bells, organ, bongos, bells, shaker
 Johnny Turnbull - backing vocals
 Mick Turner - guitar
 Victor Van Vugt - drum machine
 Norman Watt-Roy - backing vocals
 Jim White - drums
 Roland Wolf - backing vocals, handclaps, piano
 Thomas Wydler - drums, percussion, backing vocals, tambourine, handclaps

Musicians by track 

Disc 1
 "Deanna" (acoustic version)
Cave – Vocals
Harvey – Guitar, backing vocals
Wydler – percussion
Congo Powers, Bargeld, Wolf – handclaps, backing vocals
 "The Mercy Seat" (acoustic version)
Cave – vocals
Harvey – guitar, backing vocals
Wolf – piano
Bargeld – backing vocals
 "City of Refuge" (acoustic version)
Cave – Vocals
Harvey – guitar, backing vocals
Bargeld, Wydler, Congo Powers, Wolf – handclaps, backing vocals
 "The Moon is in the Gutter"
Cave – vocals, piano
Bargeld – guitar
Race – guitar
Adamson – bass
Harvey – drums
 "The Six Strings that Drew Blood"
Cave – vocals, whistling
Harvey – Guitars, Bass, Keyboard
Bargeld – Feedback Guitar
 "Rye Whiskey"
Cave – Vocals, Harmonica
Harvey – Acoustic Guitar, Drums
Race – Guitar
Tracy Pew – Bass
 "Running Scared"
Cave – Vocals
Harvey – Drums, String Arrangement
Race – Guitar
Tracy Pew – Bass
 "Black Betty"
Cave – Vocals
Harvey – Drums, Backing vocals
Bargeld – Backing vocals
 "Scum" – 2:53
Cave – Vocals
Bargeld – Guitar
Harvey – Bass
Wydler – Drums
 "The Girl at the Bottom of My Glass"
Cave – Vocals, Guitar, Backing vocals
Harvey – Drums, Backing vocals
Tony Cohen – Backing vocals
 "The Train Song" – 3:26
Cave – Vocals, Piano
Harvey – Acoustic Guitar, Bass
Bargeld – Guitar
Congo Powers – Tremolo Guitar
Wydler – Drums
Harvey & Bill McGee – String Arrangement
 "Cocks 'N' Asses"
Cave – Piano, Vocals, String Synth
Harvey – Guitar, Sound Effects
Victor Van Vugt – Drum Machine
 "Blue Bird"
Cave – Vocals, Piano, Hammond organ
Harvey – Marimba
Casey – Bass
Wydler – Drums
 "Helpless"
Cave – Vocals, Keyboard
Harvey – Acoustic Guitar, Bass, Organ, Drums, Backing vocals
Congo Powers – Slide Guitar
Bronwyn Adams – Backing vocals
 "God's Hotel"
Cave – Vocals
Harvey – Acoustic Guitar
Bargeld – Slide Guitar
Savage – Piano
Casey – Bass
Wydler – Drums
 "(I'll Love You) Till the End of the World"
Cave – Vocals, Piano
Bargeld – Guitar
Harvey – Acoustic Guitar, Bass, String Arrangement
Wydler – Drums
Bronwyn Adams – Violin
 "Cassiel's Song"
Cave – Vocals, Piano
Adamson – Bass, Timpani
Harvey – String Arrangement
 "Tower of Song"
Cave – Vocals
Harvey – Guitar
Bargeld – Guitar, Vocals
Casey – Bass
Wydler – Drums
 "What Can I Give You?"
Cave – Vocals, Piano
Harvey – Acoustic Guitar
Savage – Electric Piano
Casey – Bass
Wydler – Drums

Disc 2
 "What a Wonderful World"
Cave – Vocals
Shane MacGowan – Vocals
Harvey – Acoustic Guitar
Bargeld – Guitar
Savage – Piano
Casey – Bass
Wydler – Drums
Bill McGee – Woodwind Arrangement
 "Rainy Night in Soho"
Cave – Vocals
Harvey – Acoustic Guitar, Vibes
Bargeld – Guitar
Savage – Piano
Casey – Bass
Wydler – Drums
Harvey & Bill McGee – String & Woodwind Arrangement
 "Lucy" (Version #2)
MacGowan – Vocals
Cave – Piano, Backing vocals
Harvey & Bill McGee – String Arrangement
 "Jack the Ripper" (acoustic version)
Cave – Vocals
Harvey – Acoustic Guitar
The Bad Seeds – Backing vocals, Percussion
 "Sail Away"
Cave – Vocals, Hammond organ
Harvey – Marimba
Savage – Backing vocals
Casey – Bass
Wydler – Drums
 "There's No Night Out in the Jail"
Cave – Vocals, Harmonica organ
Harvey – Organ, Guitar
Savage – Piano
Casey – Bass
Wydler – Drums
 "That's What Jazz is to Me"
Cave – Vocals, Piano
Savage – Hammond organ
Harvey – Bass
Wydler – Drums
 "The Willow Garden"
Savage – Vocals, Piano
Cave – Hammond organ
Ellis – Violin
Casey – Bass
Harvey – Cymbals
 "The Ballad of Robert Moore and Betty Coltrane"
Cave – Vocals, Hammond organ, Piano, Sound Effects
Harvey – Acoustic Guitar
Casey – Bass
Wydler – Drums, Percussion
Terry Edwards – Brass Section
 "King Kong Kitchee Kitchee Ki-Mi-O"
Cave – Vocals
Bargeld – Guitar
Ellis – Violin
Race – Guitar
Casey – Bass
Wydler – Drums
Sclavunos, Tony Cohen, Astrid Munday – Percussion
 "Knoxville Girl"
Cave – Vocals
Johnston – Guitars
 "Where the Wild Roses Grow"
Bargeld – Vocals, Guitar
Cave – Vocals, Piano
Harvey – Guitars, Backing vocals
Casey – Bass
Savage – Piano
Wydler – Drums
Sclavunos – Tubular Bells
 "O'Malley's Bar Pt. 1"
Cave – Vocals
Harvey – Piano
Savage – Organ
Casey – Bass
Wydler – Drums
Sclavunos – Brushed Snare
 "O'Malley's Bar Pt. 2"
Cave – Vocals
Harvey – Piano
Savage – Organ
Casey – Bass
Wydler – Drums
Sclavunos – Brushed Snare
 "O'Malley's Bar Pt. 3"
Cave – Vocals
Harvey – Piano
Savage – Organ
Casey – Bass
Wydler – Drums
Sclavunos – Brushed Snare
 "Time Jesum Transeuntum Et Non Riverentum"
Cave – Vocals, Piano
Ellis – Violin
Mick Turner – Guitar
Jim White – Drums
 "O'Malley's Bar Reprise"
Cave – Vocals
Harvey – Piano
Savage – Organ
Casey – Bass
Wydler – Drums
Sclavunos – Brushed Snare
 "Red Right Hand" (Scream 3 version)
Cave – Vocals, Hammond organ
Harvey – Guitar
Bargeld – Guitar
Casey – Bass
Wydler – Drums, Percussion
Adamson – Orchestral Arrangement

Disc 3
 "Little Empty Boat"
Cave – Vocals, Piano
Harvey – Guitar, Organ
Bargeld – Guitar, Backing vocals
Casey – Bass, Backing vocals
Wydler – Drums, Backing vocals
Sclavunos – Percussion
Ellis – Looped Violin
 "Right Now I'm A-Roaming"
Cave – Vocals, Keyboard
Harvey – Organ, Guitar, Backing vocals
Bargeld – Guitar, Backing vocals
Savage – Piano
Casey – Bass
Wydler – Drums
Sclavunos – Bells
 "Come Into My Sleep"
Cave – Vocals
Harvey – Xylophone, Guitar, Organ
Bargeld – Guitar
Savage – Piano
Casey – Bass
Wydler – Drums
Sclavunos – Bongos
 "Black Hair" (band version) 
Cave – Vocals, Piano
Sclavunos – Organ
Casey – Bass
Wydler – Drums
 "Babe, I Got You Bad"
Cave – Vocals
Harvey – Guitar, Organ
Bargeld – Guitar
Savage – Piano
Casey – Bass
Wydler – Drums
Sclavunos – Tambourine
 "Sheep May Safely Graze"
Cave – Vocals
Harvey – Guitar
Bargeld – Guitar
Savage – Piano
Casey – Bass
 "Opium Tea"
Cave – Vocals, Hammond organ
Savage – Piano
Casey – Bass
Wydler – Drums
 "Grief Came Riding"
Cave – Vocals, Piano
Harvey – Guitar
Casey – Bass
Wydler – Drums
Kate & Anna McGarrigle – Backing vocals
 "Bless His Ever Loving Heart"
Cave – Vocals, Piano
Harvey – Guitar
Ellis – Violin
Casey – Bass
Wydler – Drums
Kate & Anna McGarrigle – Backing vocals
 "Good Good Day"
Cave – Vocals, Piano
Harvey – Guitar
Bargeld – Guitar
Casey – Bass
Wydler – Drums
Sclavunos – Tambourine
 "Little Janey's Gone"
Cave – Vocals, Piano
Harvey – Guitar
Bargeld – Guitar
Ellis – Violin
Casey – Bass
Wydler – Drums
 "I Feel So Good"
Cave – Vocals, Hammond organ
Harvey – Guitar, Backing vocals
Savage – Piano, Backing vocals
Sclavunos – Drums
 "Shoot Me Down"
Cave – Vocals, Piano
Harvey – Guitar, Hammond organ
Ellis – Violin
Casey – Bass
Wydler – Drums
The Blockheads – Backing vocals
 "Swing Low"
Cave – Vocals, Hammond organ
Harvey – Guitar, Hammond
Bargeld – Pedal Steel Guitar
Ellis – Violin
Casey – Bass
Wydler – Drums
Sclavunos – Tubular Bells, Tambourine
The Blockheads – Backing vocals
 "Little Ghost Song"
Cave – Vocals, Piano, Hammond organ
Savage – Vocal
Harvey – Guitar, Backing vocals
Bargeld – Guitar
Ellis – Violin
Casey – Bass
Wydler – Drums
 "Everything Must Converge"
Cave – Vocals, Hammond organ, Harmonica
Bargeld – Guitar
Harvey – Bass
Sclavunos – Drums
The Blockheads – Backing vocals
 "Nocturama" 
Cave – Vocals
Harvey – Guitar
Bargeld – Guitar
Savage – Organ
Casey – Bass
Wydler – Drums
Sclavunos – Shaker
The Blockheads – Backing vocals
 "She's Leaving You"
Cave – Vocals, Piano
Harvey – Guitar
Ellis – Bouzouki
Johnston – Organ
Savage – Piano
Casey – Bass
Sclavunos – Drums
Wydler – Tambourine
 "Under This Moon"
Cave – Vocals, Piano
Harvey – Guitar
Ellis – Mandolin
Johnston – Organ
Casey – Bass
Sclavunos – Drums
Wydler – Tambourine

References

External links
 

Albums produced by Nick Launay
Albums produced by Flood (producer)
Albums produced by Gareth Jones (music producer)
Albums produced by Victor Van Vugt
Albums produced by Tony Cohen
B-side compilation albums
Nick Cave compilation albums
2005 compilation albums
Mute Records compilation albums